Duliskan, Dulis Kan, Dhulis Kan, Doliskan, Dowlisgan, Dowliskan, and Dulisgan may refer to:

Duliskan-e Olya
Duliskan-e Sofla
Duliskan-e Vosta